The 1971 Merdeka Tournament was held from 4 to 21 August 1971 with 12 participating teams.

Group stage

Group A

Group B

Eleventh place

Ninth place

Seventh place

Fifth place

Knockout stage

Semi-finals

Third place

Final

References 
Morrison, Neil. "Merdeka Tournament 1971 (Malaysia)". RSSSF.com

Merdeka Tournament, 1971
Merdeka Tournament, 1971
Merdeka Cup
Mer